Ryan Pitylak (born 1982) is an American entrepreneur and chief marketing officer of ZenBusiness, a start up business platform public-benefit corporation based in Austin, Texas. He is a former internet spammer who, in civil settlements with the state of Texas and Microsoft, admitted to "sending 25 million e-mails every day at the height of his spamming operation in 2004" and paid out over $1 million.

Pitylak is a graduate of the University of Texas, where he received undergraduate degrees in economics and philosophy. In June 2006, he launched Pitylak Security, an Internet security company that focused on anti-spam consulting.

Pitylak is the former chief executive officer of Unique Influence, a digital marketing consulting firm he co-founded in 2011. In 2015, Unique Influence was acquired by Assembly.

Pitylak co-founded ZenBusiness in 2015 to encourage entrepreneurial microbusinesses. In 2020, the company secured $55 million in Series-B funding which will be used to continue growing the company and expand its services.

See also
List of spammers

References

Living people
Email spammers
1982 births